Atelognathus solitarius is a species of frog in the family Batrachylidae.
It is endemic to Argentina.
Its natural habitats are subtropical or tropical dry shrubland and rivers.

References

Atelognathus
Amphibians of Argentina
Amphibians of Patagonia
Endemic fauna of Argentina
Taxonomy articles created by Polbot
Amphibians described in 1970
Taxa named by José Miguel Alfredo María Cei